Enver Lugušić (born 1 May 1961) is a retired Bosnian goalkeeper and current goalkeeping coach, who last managed Al-Fujairah.

Playing career

Club
He started his career in FK Lokomotiva Brčko in 1979. Two years later, he moved to FK Jedinstvo Brčko where he played until  1986. Then he left to play in FK Sarajevo where he spent four seasons before eventually leaving for Turkish Konyaspor. In Konyaspor, he was proclaimed the best goalkeeper of Turkish Süper Lig twice and won Gold Gloves British Petrol twice. In 1992, he left for Kayserispor where he played successfully until 1995.

International
Between 1986 and 1990 he played three matches for Yugoslav Olympic team.

Coaching career
Lugušić started his coaching career in 2002 in Bulgarian club PFC Slavia Sofia. In 2004 he joined Bosnia and Herzegovina national Under-21 football team where he worked with national coach Mišo Smajlović, famous ex FK Željezničar Sarajevo player. In 2006 he leaves for Iranian club Pegah F.C. where he worked until 2007. In February 2007 Lugušić joined another Iranian club Saba Battery.  In 2008, he leaves for Chinese Shanghai Shenhua where he spent two years. While in Shanghai, he worked for Bosnia and Herzegovina national football team with Croatian manager Miroslav Blažević. He leaves for Chinese  Shandong Luneng in 2010 where he worked with Croatian coach Branko Ivanković. As of 2011 he joins Iranian Persepolis with Turkish coach Mustafa Denizli. After their contract ended in 2012, Enver left for Al Wahda, UAE Arabian Gulf League. He worked in another club in UAE in 2014, Al Fujairah coached by Džemal Hadžiabdić, but after a short period of time he received an invitation for Bosnia and Herzegovina national football team coached by Mehmed Baždarević which he didn't turn down. With Bosnia and Herzegovina national football team he won Kirin Cup held in Japan. In 2016, he received a call from  Japan national football team, led by Vahid Halilhodžić, and signed a contract. In 2017 Enver qualified for the FIFA World Cup 2018 with Japan national football team which was held in Russia. After the contract with head coach Vahid was terminated, Lugušić decided to leave as well. In 2018 he accepted invitation from Maktoom, Sheikh of Al-Fujairah SC and joined the staff of Czech coach Ivan Hašek.

References

External links
 Enver Lugušić at jfa.jp
 Enver Lugušić at klix.ba 
 Enver Lugušić at klix.ba
 
 Enver Lugušić at EX YU Fudbalska Statistika po godinama
 Enver Lugušić at reprezentacija.ba

1961 births
Living people
People from Foča
Association football goalkeepers
Yugoslav footballers
Bosnia and Herzegovina footballers
FK Jedinstvo Brčko players
FK Sarajevo players
Konyaspor footballers
Kayserispor footballers
Yugoslav First League players
Süper Lig players
Yugoslav expatriate footballers
Bosnia and Herzegovina expatriate footballers
Expatriate footballers in Turkey
Yugoslav expatriate sportspeople in Turkey
Bosnia and Herzegovina expatriate sportspeople in Turkey
Association football goalkeeping coaches
Persepolis F.C. non-playing staff
Bosnia and Herzegovina expatriate sportspeople in Iran
Bosnia and Herzegovina expatriate sportspeople in China
Bosnia and Herzegovina expatriate sportspeople in the United Arab Emirates
Bosnia and Herzegovina expatriate sportspeople in Japan